Ognjen Stjepanović (born 9 August 1998) is a Bosnian professional footballer who plays as a left winger.

Career
In July 2020, Stjepanović moved from Olimpik to Sloboda Tuzla in the Bosnian Premier League, only to leave them after one month already and not playing a single game. After leaving Sloboda, he joined First League of RS club Zvijezda 09. Stjepanović finished the 2020–21 season with Zvijezda 09 as the league's joint top goalscorer with 14 goals.

On 26 July 2021, he returned to the Bosnian Premier League, signing with Željezničar. Without a single official appearance for the club, Stjepanović left Željezničar in January 2022.

Honours
Olimpik
First League of FBiH: 2019–20

Individual
Performance
First League of RS Top Goalscorer: 2020–21 (14 goals)

References

External links
Ognjen Stjepanović at Sofascore

1998 births
Living people
People from Zvornik
Association football wingers
Bosnia and Herzegovina footballers
FK Drina Zvornik players
FK Brodarac players
FK Olimpik players
FK Sloboda Tuzla players
FK Zvijezda 09 players
FK Željezničar Sarajevo players
Premier League of Bosnia and Herzegovina players
First League of the Republika Srpska players
First League of the Federation of Bosnia and Herzegovina players
Bosnia and Herzegovina expatriate footballers
Expatriate footballers in Serbia
Bosnia and Herzegovina expatriate sportspeople in Serbia